Lieutenant-General Douglas Povah Dickinson CB DSO OBE MC (6 November 1886 – 8 January 1949) was a senior British Army officer who commanded the East Africa Force at the start of the Second World War.

Military career
After attending the Royal Military College at Sandhurst, Dickinson was commissioned into the Welch Regiment on 6 October 1906.

He served in France and Belgium during the First World War. After attending the Staff College, Camberley from 1919 to 1920, he was appointed Deputy Assistant Quartermaster-General there in 1925, Inspector of the Iraq Army in Kurdistan in 1930 and Inspector with British Military Mission attached to the Iraq Army in 1932. He went on to be Commanding Officer of the 1st Battalion of The Welch Regiment in 1934, Commandant of the Nigeria Regiment in 1936 and Inspector-General of the African Colonial Forces early in 1939. Dickinson served in the Second World War as General Officer Commanding the East Africa Force from September 1939 and as Chief of Staff of Western Command from January 1941. He retired in 1944.

Family
In 1924 he married Frances Mildred Wilson; they had two daughters.

Bibliography

References

External links
British Army Officers 1939−1945
Generals of World War II

1886 births
1949 deaths
Welch Regiment officers
British Army personnel of World War I
British Army generals of World War II
Companions of the Order of the Bath
Companions of the Distinguished Service Order
Officers of the Order of the British Empire
Recipients of the Military Cross
Graduates of the Staff College, Camberley
British Army lieutenant generals
Academics of the Staff College, Camberley